Homero Francesch (born 6 December 1947, Montevideo, Uruguay) is a Uruguay-born Swiss pianist.

Biography
Francesch took piano lessons with Santiago Baranda Reyes in Uruguay. In 1967, he was awarded a scholarship by the German Academic Exchange Service (DAAD) and went on to study in Munich under Hugo Steurer and Ludwig Hoffmann.

He has premiered the works of several contemporary composers, including Hans Werner Henze's Tristan. His recordings include a complete survey of Bartók's Mikrokosmos and Stravinsky's Les Noces under Leonard Bernstein alongside Martha Argerich, Cyprien Katsaris and Krystian Zimerman.

External links 
 Personal Website
 Profile on the Swiss Music Database

1947 births
Living people
Musicians from Montevideo
Swiss classical pianists
Swiss people of Uruguayan descent
21st-century classical pianists